Tom O'Hara (July 5, 1942 – August 27, 2019) was an American middle-distance runner. He was the first native of the state of Illinois to break the four-minute barrier for the mile run when he ran 3:59.4 in 1963. O'Hara was born in Chicago, Illinois. He also held the world record for fastest mile indoors, which was set when he ran 3:56.6 on February 13, 1964. He beat that record on March 6 of the same year with a time of 3:56.4, a world record, later equalled by Jim Ryun but not beaten for ten years until Tony Waldrop ran 3:55.0 in 1974.

At St. Ignatius College Prep High School, in Chicago, Illinois, O'Hara was a star runner on the school's cross country and track and field teams, often running—and winning—the quarter mile, half mile, mile, and mile relay in a single meet. He was a member of the Loyola University Chicago track, cross country, and indoor track teams. He was the individual champion of NCAA Men's Division I Cross Country Championship in 1962, and he participated in the 1500 m at the 1964 Summer Olympics, where he qualified for the semi-finals of the 1500 metres.

References

 Creamer, Robert. "From Humdrum To Well-done In One Easy Mile," Sports Illustrated, February 24, 1964.
 Brody, Tom C. "Now, If O'hara Really Tries...," Sports Illustrated, March 16, 1964.
 Underwood, John. "Running Is Such Sweet Torture," Sports Illustrated, June 22, 1964.
 Loyola Ramblers Hall of Fame Members – Loyola University Chicago.

1942 births
2019 deaths
Track and field athletes from Chicago
American male middle-distance runners
Athletes (track and field) at the 1964 Summer Olympics
Olympic track and field athletes of the United States
Loyola Ramblers athletes